The Mendelssohn family are the descendants of  Mendel of Dassau. The German Jewish philosopher Moses Mendelssohn and his brother Saul were the first to adopt the surname Mendelssohn. The family includes his grandson, the composer Felix Mendelssohn and his granddaughter, the composer Fanny Mendelssohn.

Moses Mendelssohn
Moses Mendelssohn was a significant figure in the Age of Enlightenment in Germany. Mendelssohn had ten children, of whom six lived to adulthood.  Of those six children, only Recha and Joseph retained the Jewish religion. Abraham Mendelssohn, because of his conversion to Reformed Christianity, adopted the surname Bartholdy at the suggestion of his wife's brother, Jakob Salomon Bartholdy, who had adopted the name from a property owned by the Salomon family.

Mendelssohn's wife, Fromet (Frumet) Guggenheim, was a great-granddaughter of Samuel Oppenheimer.

Mendelssohn & Co. Bank
In 1795 Moses Mendelssohn's eldest son Joseph established the bank Mendelssohn & Co. in Berlin, and his brother Abraham joined the company in 1804. Many members of the family worked for the bank until it was forced to shut down in 1938. In 2004 relatives of the banker Paul von Mendelssohn-Bartholdy (1875–1935), led by his great-nephew Julius H. Schoeps (born 1942), tried to reclaim paintings once owned by him and later sold in the 1940s by his widow, in breach of his will.

Mendelssohn family
Descendants of Moses Mendelssohn

 Moses Mendelssohn (1729–1786), philosopher, married Fromet Guggenheim (1737–1812); 6 children
 Brendel Mendelssohn (1763–1839), married (i) Simon Veit, (ii) Friedrich von Schlegel
 Jonas Veit (1790–1854)
  Philipp Veit (1793–1877)
 Recha Mendelssohn (1767–1831)
 Joseph Mendelssohn (1770–1848), banker
 Benjamin (Georg) Mendelssohn (1794–1874), geographer
  Alexander Mendelssohn (1798–1871), banker
 Marie Mendelssohn (1822–1891), married Robert Warschauer (1816–1884), banker
 Anna Warschauer (1841–1866), married Ludwig Passini (1832–1903), painter
  Marie Warschauer (1855–1906), married Ernst von Mendelssohn-Bartholdy (1846–1909) see below (A)
 Margarete Mendelssohn (1823–1890), married Otto Georg Oppenheim (1817–1909), jurist
 Hugo Oppenheim (1847–1921), banker, married Anna Oppenheim (1849–1931)
 Else Oppenheim (1873–1945), married Josef Block (1863–1943), painter
  Anna Luise Block (1896–1982), publicist; married: (ii)  (1901–1955), writer; (iii) Alfred Winslow Jones (1900–1989), hedge fund pioneer
  Robert Hugo Oppenheim (1882–1956), banker married (i) Charlotte Simon; (ii) Ehrentraut Margaret Von Ilberg      4 children Hugo Oppenheim, Alexander Oppenheim, Imogene Oppenheim, Roberta Marielouise Oppenheim
 Franz Oppenheim (1852–1929), chemist
  Clara Oppenheim (1861–1944), married Adolf Gusserow (1836–1906), gynecologist
 Franz von Mendelssohn (1829–1889), banker
 Robert von Mendelssohn (1857–1917), banker, married Giulietta Gordigiani, pianist
 Eleonora von Mendelssohn (1900–1951), actress, married Martin Kosleck, actor
  Francesco von Mendelssohn (1901–1972), cellist, theatre director
  Franz von Mendelssohn (1865–1935), banker, married Maria Westphal (1867–1957), see below (B)
 Lilli von Mendelssohn (1897–1928), violinist, married Emil Bohnke, violist and composer
  Robert-Alexander Bohnke (1927–2005), pianist
  Robert von Mendelssohn (1902–1996), banker
  Clara Mendelssohn (1840–1927), married Karl Friedrich Otto Westphal (1833–1890), psychiatrist
 Alexander Carl Otto Westphal (1863–1941), neurologist
 Anna Westphal (1864–1943), married Eduard Sonnenburg (1848–1915), doctor
  Marie Westphal (1867–1957), married Franz von Mendelssohn (1865–1935), see above (B)
 Henriette (Maria) Mendelssohn (1775–1831)
 Abraham Mendelssohn Bartholdy (1776–1835), banker, married Lea Salomon, granddaughter of Daniel Itzig; 4 children
 Fanny Mendelssohn (1805–1847) composer, married Wilhelm Hensel (1794–1861)
  Sebastian Ludwig Felix Hensel (1830–1898) married Julie von Adelson
 Fanny Römer, née Hensel (1857–1891)
 Cécile Hensel (1858–1928) married Friedrich Leo (1851–1914)
 Erika Leo (1887–1949) married Walther Brecht
 Ulrich Leo (1890–1964), Literary scientist
 Paul Leo (1893–1958), Lutheran pastor and theologian, married 1.: Anna Siegert († 1931), 2.: Eva Dittrich (1901–1998)
 Anna Leo (born 1931), Children's author
 Christopher Leo (born 1941), political scientist
 Monica Leo (born 1944), puppeteer
 Paul Hensel (1860–1930), philosopher
  Kurt Hensel (1861–1941), mathematician
 Albert Hensel (1895–1933), law professor
 Ruth Hensel (1888–1979)
  Charlotte Hensel (1896–1990), married Werner Bergengruen (1892–1964), novelist
 Felix Mendelssohn (Jakob Ludwig Felix Mendelssohn Bartholdy) (1809–1847), composer married Cécile Charlotte Sophie Jeanrenaud (1817–1853)
 Karl Mendelssohn Bartholdy (1838–1897), historian
 Cécile von Mendelssohn Bartholdy (1870–1943), married Otto von Mendelssohn Bartholdy (1868–1949), see below (C)
  Albrecht Mendelssohn Bartholdy (1874–1936), law professor, married Dorothea Wach (1875–1949), see below (D)
 Marie Mendelssohn Bartholdy (1839–1897)
 Paul Mendelssohn Bartholdy (1841–1880), chemist
 Otto von Mendelssohn Bartholdy (1868–1949), banker, married Cécile Mendelssohn Bartholdy (1870–1943), see above (C)
  Paul Mendelssohn Bartholdy (1879–1956), chemist
 Felix Mendelssohn Bartholdy (1843–1850)
  Elisabeth Mendelssohn Bartholdy (1845–1910) married Adolf Wach
 Felix Wach (1871–1943)
  Joachim Wach (1898–1955)
  Dorothea Wach (1875–1949) married Albrecht Mendelssohn Bartholdy (1874–1936), see above (D)
 Rebecka Mendelssohn (1811–1858) married Peter Gustav Lejeune Dirichlet (1805–1859), mathematician
 Walter Lejeune Dirichlet (1833-1887) married Anna Sachs (1835-1889)
 Elisabeth Lejeune-Dirichlet (1860-1920) married Heinrich Nelson (1854-1929), lawyer
 Leonard Nelson (1882-1927), philosopher
  Paul Mendelssohn-Bartholdy (1812–1874), banker, married Pauline Louise Albertine Heine (1814-1879)
  Ernst von Mendelssohn-Bartholdy (1846–1909), banker, married Marie Warschauer (1855–1906), see above (A)
 Katharine von Mendelssohn-Bartholdy (1870–1943)
 Charlotte von Mendelssohn-Bartholdy (1871–1961)
 Paul von Mendelssohn-Bartholdy (1875–1935), banker
 Enole Marie von Mendelssohn-Bartholdy (1879–1947), married Albert Constantin, Graf von Schwerin (1870–1956), diplomat, had issue
 Marie Busch (1881–1970), married Felix Busch (1871–1938), state official
  Dorothea Busch (1915–1996), married Hans-Joachim Schoeps (1909–1980), theologian
  Julius H. Schoeps (born 1942), historian
  Alexander von Mendelssohn-Bartholdy (1889–1917)
  Nathan Mendelssohn (1781–1852) instrument maker, married Henrietta Itzig, cousin of Lea Soloman and granddaughter of Daniel Itzig
 Arnold Mendelssohn (1817–1854), a political follower of Ferdinand Lassalle
 Ottilie Mendelssohn (1819–1848) married Ernst Kummer (1810–1893), mathematician
  Marie Elisabeth Kummer (1842–1921) married Hermann Schwarz (1843–1921), mathematician
   Wilhelm Mendelssohn (1821–1866) married Louise Aimee Cauer (sister to Bertha Cauer)
  Arnold Mendelssohn (1855–1933) composer, married Maria Cauer

Descendants of Saul Mendelssohn include:
Philibert Mendelssohn, as a mathematician appointed as 'Koenigliche Rechnungsrat' in the Prussian State Survey
Kurt Mendelssohn, mathematician, one of Philibert's grandchildren
Heinrich Mendelssohn, biologist, also one of Philibert's grandchildren

Gallery
Children of Moses and Fromet Mendelssohn:

Children of Abraham Mendelssohn Bartholdy:

Notes

References

 This article was initially translated from the German Wikipedia.

External links

 Guide to the Mendelssohn Family Papers at the Leo Baeck Institute, New York.

 
Business families
Jewish-German families